Standing Together is an album by Midnight Star. It was released in 1981 on SOLAR Records.

Track listing
"Standing Together"   5:00 	
"Tuff "  5:05 	
"Can't Give You Up"  4:13 	
"Hold Out"  4:58 	
"I've Been Watching You"  6:00 	
"I Won't Let You Be Lonely"  4:05 	
"I Got What You Need"  4:38 	
"Open Up To Love"  4:38

Chart positions

Album

Singles

References

External links
 Midnight Star Standing Together - Discogs
 

1981 albums
SOLAR Records albums
Albums produced by Leon Sylvers III